Lago di Poggio Perotto is a lake in the Province of Grosseto, Tuscany, Italy.

Lakes of Tuscany